Luke Ching Chin Wai (born 1972) is a conceptual artist and labour activist from Hong Kong.  His artistic practice twists the role of the artist and observer and has created works which, with a mix of humour,  respond to the cultural and political collisions in Hong Kong.  He studied at the Chinese University of Hong Kong and graduated with an MA in Fine Art in 1998. He has participated in exhibitions and residencies worldwide.

Artistic practice
Ching's works range from photography, sculpture and video to social intervention, often made as a spontaneous response to his surroundings. His artistic practices are based upon his belief in agency and responsibility of the artist for social purposes.

Since 2007 in his ongoing project undercover worker, he has worked in different low paid jobs in Hong Kong to experience their working environments and make first-hand observations of working conditions. He used his project to visualize problems hidden within Hong Kong and connect different situations and lead several campaigns to improve working conditions of low paid workers. As part of his 'labour campaigns', he has successfully improved working conditions for low paid workers, such as providing chairs for security guards and cashiers; provided a new design for public rubbish bins to make cleaner’s job easier; and urged the city’s Labour Department to improve health & safety standards related to prolonged standing. His work has launched collaborative activities to encourage employers make positive changes and raise awareness of worker’s welfare.

He also uses pinhole photography, installations and video works to document of the rapid changes to Hong Kong and other cities. In 2017 he turned a hotel room at the Titanic Hotel, Liverpool into a pinhole camera for the  Look Liverpool International Photography Festival.

His works Pokfulam Village: View (Positive) (1999), Screensaver (2014), 1823: Complex Pile (2014), and Pixel (2014) are collected by M+.

Selected exhibitions

Solo exhibitions

 2019 Liquefied Sunshine, (with South Ho Siu Nam) Blindspot Gallery, Hong Kong
2017 Allegory Practice of Personification, performing ART project,  Oi! Street Art Space, Hong Kong
 2016 For now we see through a window, dimly, Exit, Hong Kong
 2014 Screensaver, Gallery Exit, Hong Kong
 2008 Folk Art Series, Blackburn Museum and Art Gallery, Blackburn, UK
 2007 2 in 1, Hong Kong Visual Arts Centre, Hong Kong
 2006 Language Center, Fukuoka Asian Art Museum, Fukuoka, Japan
 2006 Two Associations in Vermont, Vermont Studio Center, Vermont, USA
 2005 Shanghai Street photo studio, Shanghai Street Artspace, Hong Kong

Group shows
 2018 Bicycle Thieves, Para Site, Hong Kong
 2018 Food Matters, Karin Weber Gallery, Hong Kong
 2018 THE Survey Exhibition, C&G Artpartment, Hong Kong
 2018 Imagine border, Gwangju Biennale, Gwangju, Korea
 2018 Dismantling the Scaffold, Tai Kwun, Hong Kong
2017 Composing Stories with Fragments of Time, Karin Weber Gallery, Hong Kong
2016 One belongs where one is content, 1a space, Hong Kong
2016  Connect 4, Simon Lee Gallery, Hong Kong
2016 Language, Deutsches Hygiene-Museum, Dresden
 2016 No Cause for Alarm, La MaMa Galleria, New York
2015 Ceramics Show by Non-ceramics Artist, 1a space, Hong Kong.
2015 Drawing. Art of Re-Zuo, AMNUA, Nanjing, China.
 2013 Topology of Urban Resistance, Hanina art space, Israel
 2012 Dezipcoding: Project Glocal at DiverseCity, Singapore Art Museum, Singapore
 2012 Market Force, Osage Gallery, Hong Kong
 2012 Post-Straight: Contemporary Hong Kong Photography, Hong Kong Heritage Museum
 2011 Posing Museum- A conversation between Luke Ching & Ducky Tse exhibition, Lumenvisum, Hong Kong
 2011 Primitive Craftsmanship - Contemporary Mechanism, Artist Commune, Hong Kong
 2010 The Problem of Asia, Chalk Horse, Sydney.
 2009 Charming experience, Hong Kong Museum of Art, Hong Kong
 2009 One Degree of Separation,  Chinese Arts Centre, Manchester, UK
 2008 Everyday Anomalies, Phoenix Art Association, Brighton, UK
 2007 Chinglish, Hong Kong Museum of Art, Hong Kong
 2007 Reversing Horizons, Museum of Contemporary Art Shanghai, China
 2007 Pivotal Decade, Chinese Art Centre, Manchester, UK

Festivals
  Art Basel Hong Kong 2017, Gallery Exit, Hong Kong Convention and Exhibition Centre, Hong Kong
 2017 Look/17  Liverpool International Photography Festival, Liverpool, UK
 2016 Art Basel Hong Kong, Gallery Exit 
 2014 The Invisible Hand: Curating as Gesture, 2nd CAFAM Biennale, Beijing
 2007  Lianzhou International Photo Festival, Lianzhou, China

Art residencies

 2020 Helsinki International Artist Programme
 2016 Hong Kong Design Institute, Hong Kong
 2012 Breath, Chinese Arts Centre, UK
 2008 plAAy: Hide and Seek, Blackburn Museum, UK 
 2007 Hong Kong Visual Art Centre, HK
 2006 Fukuoka Asian Art Museum Residence Program, Fukuoka, Japan
 2006 Vermont Studio Program, US
 2003 Hong Kong Institute of Education, HK
 2003 Wanakio 2003, Noren Market, Okinawa, Japan
 2000 P.S.1 Contemporary Arts Center Studio Program, New York, US

Awards
 2019 shortlisted Visible Award for Undercover Worker Project
 2016 Hong Kong Arts Development Council Artist of the Year: Visual Arts
 2005 Photography  Award Winner, Hong Kong Art Biennial Exhibition 2005, Hong Kong

References

External links
 Exit Gallery Profile
 Centre for Chinese Contemporary Art Archive & Library Profile
 Luke Ching in the Asia Art Archive

1972 births
Living people
Hong Kong artists
Conceptual artists
Chinese contemporary artists
Alumni of the Chinese University of Hong Kong